Jason "Psycho" Suttie (born 7 August 1973) is a Samoan-born New Zealand former heavyweight kickboxer and 6 time Muay Thai World champion fighting out of Elite Thai Kickboxing Gym in Auckland, New Zealand.

Biography and career

In his youth Suttie fought under the great NZ trainer Lollo Heimuli of the gym Balmoral Lee Gar, training alongside Ray Sefo, Jayson Vemoa and Doug Viney. Having some 25 fights before opening his own gym, Jason has been very successful both as an amateur and professional kickboxer. As an amateur he took a New Zealand title and the South Pacific super middleweight and light heavyweight titles.

In 1996 Jason graduated from Auckland with a B.A. in education and in the same year was the first Kiwi to fight in the K-1 kickboxing promotion, at his fight Ray Sefo was in the audience negotiating his K-1 contract.

In 1997 Jason won his first world title and by 2000 he had racked up five more world titles in five different weight divisions from super middleweight (76 kg) through to super heavyweight (95 kg) with four different federations.

In 2010 he was acquitted of aggravated robbery and blackmail charges.

Jason now owns and runs his gym Elite Thai Kickboxing with his partner Roger Earp in Auckland, New Zealand. He now promotes King in the Ring to find NZ's most promising upcoming fighters.

Titles
 2006 K-1 World Grand Prix in Auckland Runner Up
 2004 Kings of Oceania Runner Up
 2003 K-1 World Grand Prix in Melbourne Runner Up
 2002 K-1 NZ Champion
 2002 KB4 Champion
 2001 WMTA World Super Heavyweight Champion
 2001 WKBF World Heavyweight Champion
 2000 WKBF World Cruiserweight Champion
 1999 WKBF World Light Heavyweight Champion
 1998 ISKA World Super Middleweight Champion
 1996 UTC World Super Middleweight Champion

Kickboxing record

Boxing record

Mixed martial arts record

|-
|  Loss
|align=center| 0–1 
| Sergei Kharitonov
| Submission (armbar)
| PRIDE Bushido 1
| 
|align=center| 1
|align=center| 2:25
| Saitama, Japan
|

See also 
List of male kickboxers
List of K-1 events

References

External links

New Zealand male kickboxers
Samoan male kickboxers
Middleweight kickboxers
Light heavyweight kickboxers
Cruiserweight kickboxers
Heavyweight kickboxers 
Samoan male boxers
Heavyweight boxers
New Zealand Muay Thai practitioners
Samoan Muay Thai practitioners
Sportspeople from Auckland
Sportspeople from Apia
Samoan emigrants to New Zealand
1973 births
Living people
People educated at St Paul's College, Auckland
New Zealand male boxers
New Zealand male mixed martial artists
Samoan male mixed martial artists
Mixed martial artists utilizing Muay Thai
Mixed martial artists utilizing boxing
Fighters trained by Lolo Heimuli